Yamaha Enticer is an entry-level cruiser motorcycle which was produced during 2002 to 2006 in India. It is no longer in production.
It featured a feet-forward cruiser-type riding position and was available in two trims levels such as
the regular and delux. The delux variant had self-starter and disk brakes for the front wheel.

Technical description

The Yamaha Enticer had a raised handlebar, long wheel-base, easy rider seating geometry, foot boards instead of foot pegs, fat rear tyre, single pod instrument cluster. The motorcycle was available in four colour variants: Gold (light yellow), Burgundy (reddish), Black and Lavender-Silver (exclusive to the delux variant).

Motive power comes from the square, 54mm x 54mm, 123.7cc engine that it shares with the Yamaha YBX motorcycle. While max. torque of 1.06 KgM at 6500 rpm is identical to the YBX, the 11 bhp (PS) of power in the Enticer engine comes at a slower 8000 rpm while in the YBX it comes at a higher 8500 rpm. Compression ratio of the Enticer is 10:1. Maximum speed can reach 120kph

Wheelbase is 1,375 mm with a claimed ground clearance of 140 mm. Kerb weight (with oil and full petrol tank) is 125 kg while dry weight is 116 kg. Fuel tank capacity is 13 liters with a reserve of 2.4 liters. The VM20SS, Ucal / Mikuni carburettor breathes through a wet type air cleaner. Fuel is ignited by an NGK spark plug, model CR7HSA with ideal plug gap being 0.65 mm. Ignition is CDI.

Electricity is produced by a 12 volt flywheel magneto with a 12v-2.5 Ah lead acid battery. Headlight power is 12v-35w. Front tyre is a 4-ply rating 2.75 x 18 (Zapper FS pattern), while at the rear is a 6-ply rating 120/80 x 16, Y-pattern Zapper.

Engine oil specified is Yamalube 4-stroke motor oil (20W40 type SF) or equivalent. Yamaha also warns not to use oils that contain anti-friction modifiers or car oils (often referred to as Energy conserving oils) that contain anti-friction additives, since this will cause clutch slippage and will in turn reduce life of components and cause drop in engine performance. While total quantity of engine oil is 1.2 liters, top up quantity is a convenient one liter.

The  MRF Zapper wide tyres for the rear wheel are no more available in the Indian market.

See also

 Yamaha Virago
 Yamaha Royal Star

References

Enticer
Motorcycles introduced in 2003
Cruiser motorcycles